List of reptiles of the Canary Islands is an incomplete list of reptiles found in the Canary Islands. This list includes both endemic and introduced species.

Order: Squamata

Lizards

Infraorder Gekkota

Family Phyllodactylidae 
East Canary gecko, Tarentola angustimentalis 
Boettger's wall gecko, Tarentola boettgeri 
Tenerife gecko, Tarentola delalandii 
Gomero wall gecko, Tarentola gomerensis

Family Gekkonidae
Mediterranean house gecko, Hemidactylus turcicus  (Gran Canaria and Tenerife)

Superfamily Lacertoidea

Family Lacertidae
Atlantic lizard, Gallotia atlantica 
Boettger's lizard, Gallotia caesaris 
West Canaries lizard, Gallotia galloti 
El Hierro giant lizard, Gallotia simonyi 
La Gomera giant lizard, Gallotia bravoana 
Gran Canaria giant lizard, Gallotia stehlini 
La Palma giant lizard, Gallotia auaritae 
Tenerife giant lizard, Gallotia goliath 
Tenerife speckled lizard, Gallotia intermedia

Infraorder Scincomorpha

Family Scincidae
East Canary skink, Chalcides simonyi 
Gran Canaria skink, Chalcides sexlineatus 
West Canary skink, Chalcides viridanus

Snakes

Suborder Serpentes

Family Typhlopidae 
Brahminy blind snake, Indotyphlops braminus

Family Colubridae 
California kingsnake, Lampropeltic californiae

Order: Testudines

Turtles

Suborder Cryptodira

Family Testudinidae 
Tenerife giant tortoise, Centrochelys burchardi 
Gran Canaria giant tortoise, Centrochelys vulcanica

Family Cheloniidae 
Loggerhead sea turtle, Caretta caretta 
Green sea turtle, Chelonia mydas 
Hawksbill sea turtle, Eretmochelys imbricata 
Kemp's ridley sea turtle, Lepidochelys kempii

Family Dermochelyidae
Leatherback sea turtle, Dermochelys coriacea

References 

Amphibians and Reptiles in the Canary Islands, Focus on Nature

Canary Islands
Canary Islands
Reptiles
Canary Islands